Duilio Torres (14 August 1882 – 28 June 1972) was an Italian architect. Torres was a master builder in Venice, and his work was part of the architecture event in the art competition at the 1928 Summer Olympics.

References

1882 births
1972 deaths
20th-century Italian architects
Olympic competitors in art competitions
Architects from Venice